KDMD (channel 33) is a television station in Anchorage, Alaska, United States, affiliated with Ion Television and Telemundo. The station is owned by Ketchikan Television, and maintains studios on East 66th Avenue near the Seward Highway in Anchorage; its transmitter is located in Eagle River.

History
The station debuted on the air on October 1, 1989, with a mix of religious, classic TV and paid programming before joining Pax TV (the original name for Ion) in 1998. Today, it airs Ion and a variety of local programming. From 2002 to 2006, KDMD carried Seattle Mariners baseball via the Mariners Television Network.

In June 2007, the station began broadcasting Telemundo on a digital subchannel, making it the first Spanish-language broadcast station in Alaska.

KDMD-DT3
KDMD-DT3 (branded on-air as MeTV Alaska) is the MeTV-affiliated third digital subchannel of KDMD, broadcasting in standard definition on channel 33.3. In addition to MeTV programming, the subchannel broadcasts a mix of local Alaskan programming daily from both professional and amateur video producers. Until 2010, KDMD-DT3 operated as a separate station on analog UHF channel 38 under the calls KACN-LP. On April 24, 2014, KACN became a MeTV affiliate.

Technical information

Subchannels
The station's digital signal is multiplexed:

See also
KUBD-LP

References

External links
 Station website
 Telemundo Alaska

1989 establishments in Alaska
Television channels and stations established in 1989
DMD (TV)
Ion Television affiliates
Telemundo network affiliates
MeTV affiliates
Grit (TV network) affiliates
Laff (TV network) affiliates
Court TV affiliates
Buzzr affiliates
Movies! affiliates
Decades (TV network) affiliates